The Northland Peninsula, called the North Auckland Peninsula in earlier times, is in the far north of the North Island of New Zealand. It is joined to the rest of the island by the Auckland isthmus, a narrow piece of land between the Waitematā Harbour and the Manukau Harbour in the middle of the Auckland metropolitan area. The peninsula is not conterminous with the local government area of Northland Region, which occupies the northern 80% of the peninsula. The southern section of the peninsula is administratively part of the Auckland Region.

Geology 

The peninsula formed as an island 22 million years ago, when the area was uplifted due to interactions between the Pacific Plate and Australian Plate. Between 25 and 22 million years ago, Northland and the East Cape were adjacent, with the East Cape moving south-east due to tectonic forces. Much of the land of Northland is an allochthon, a large block of land formed elsewhere and moved into its current position. When Northland was uplifted, much of the land that would form the central Auckland Region was subsided 2-3,000 metres to the sea floor. The Waitemata Group sedimentary rock found in the Northland and Auckland Regions is material which was eroded from the Northland island and deposited on the deep sea floor.

Geography 

The peninsula stretches northwest for about 330 kilometres from the Auckland isthmus (or Tamaki isthmus), reaching a maximum width of 85 kilometres. It has a convoluted coastline, with many smaller peninsulas branching off it.

The last 100 kilometres of its length is the Aupouri Peninsula – a peninsula on a peninsula – narrowing to only some 10 kilometres in width. At its northern end, the Aupouri Peninsula includes a number of capes: Cape Maria van Diemen, Cape Reinga, North Cape, and the Surville Cliffs, the northernmost point, at latitude 34° 23' 47" South.

The Kaipara Harbour part way up the peninsula's western (Tasman Sea) shore is one of the largest harbours in the world, stretching some 65 kilometres from north to south. Further north is the smaller Hokianga harbour, which is of historic and cultural significance, especially to the Māori people. Another historically significant site is Waitangi and the surrounding Bay of Islands. This was a major settlement in early colonial New Zealand, and was the site of the first signing of the Treaty of Waitangi, which is seen as the founding document of New Zealand's nationhood.

The largest settlement on the peninsula (other than parts of the Auckland conurbation) is Whangarei, on a harbour opening on the Pacific Ocean close to the peninsula's widest point.

References

Peninsulas of the Auckland Region